Ghetto Heisman is the second solo studio album by American rapper WC. It was released on November 12, 2002 via Def Jam Recordings. Recording sessions took place at Paramount Recording Studios, at Ameraycan Studios, and at Larrabee Sound Studios in Los Angeles, and at Criteria Studios in Miami Beach. Production was handled by several record producers, including Tony Pizarro, DJ Battlecat, Crazy Toones, Buckwild, Rick Rock and Scott Storch. It features guest appearances from Butch Cassidy, Case, Kokane, MC Ren, Nate Dogg, Scarface, Snoop Dogg and Westside Connection among others.

The album peaked at number 46 on the US Billboard 200 and at number seven on the US Billboard Top R&B/Hip-Hop Albums chart.

Upon the album's release, it was discovered that the first pressings were issued with a noticeable skip on the track "Tears of a Killa".

Track listing

Notes
Track 2 features additional vocals by Deidre Oliphant
Track 9 features additional vocals by Maurice Hill and Shawndell Rosa
Track 13 features additional vocals by Traci Nelson
Track 14 features additional vocals by Black Chill and DJ Crazy Toones
Sample credits
Track 1 contains samples from the Brides of Frankenstein recording of "Disco to Go" (written by George Clinton Jr. and William Earl Collins)
Track 5 contains interpolations from "The Bridge Is Over" (written by Lawrence Parker and Scott La Rock), an interpolation of "Heads High" (written by Smith & Browne), and elements from "Can't Make It Without Me" performed by Shawne Jackson
Track 13 contains elements from "Atmosphere" performed by Funkadelic

Charts

References

External links

2002 albums
WC (rapper) albums
Def Jam Recordings albums
Albums produced by Buckwild
Albums produced by Rick Rock
Albums produced by Scott Storch
Gangsta rap albums by American artists
Albums produced by Battlecat (producer)